The Crystal Ice Company Building is a historic building located at 2024 North Davis Street in Pensacola, Florida. Built in 1932, the building was used by the Crystal Ice Company to sell ice to travelers. The building, which resembles a block of ice, is one of the few surviving vernacular roadside buildings in Pensacola. On September 29, 1983, it was added to the U.S. National Register of Historic Places.

History 
Around 1930, Guy Spearman established the Crystal Ice Company in Pensacola. The ice industry had developed in the late 1860s with the growth of the area's fishing industry; yet by the 1920s, refrigerators began to reduce the need for manufactured ice. In 1970, upon Spearman's death, the company was bought by Connohio Corporation.

See also
 List of ice companies

References

External links
 Crystal Ice House at RoadsideAmerica

Buildings and structures in Pensacola, Florida
National Register of Historic Places in Escambia County, Florida
Vernacular architecture in Florida
Roadside attractions in Florida
Ice companies
1932 establishments in Florida